Myaundzha is an urban locality (an urban-type settlement) in Susumansky District of Magadan Oblast, Russia, located in the Kolyma Mountains, on the right bank of the Myaundzha River (a part of the Ayan-Yuryakh River system), about  north-northwest of Magadan, the administrative center of the oblast. Population:

History
It was founded in 1950 in conjunction with the construction of the coal-fired Arkagalinskaya thermal power station, which began operation in 1955. Urban-type settlement status was granted to it in 1957.

Economy and transportation
Most of the settlement's population is employed at the power station, which is the second largest source of electricity in the oblast behind the hydroelectric plant on the Kolyma River near Sinegorye.

The M56 Kolyma Highway runs close by, allowing road access to Magadan.

References

Urban-type settlements in Magadan Oblast